James Edward Collin (16 March 1876, Kirtling – 16 September 1968) was an English entomologist who specialised in Diptera.

He was the author of Empididae. British Flies, Volume 6. University Press, Cambridge (1961). This was the third volume in an uncompleted series begun by his uncle George Henry Verrall.

Collin wrote extensively on Diptera of most families of Diptera (excepting those in Nematocera). The specimens collected by Collin and his uncle Verrall are in the Hope Entomological Collections at the University of Oxford. The OUM website provides a searchable database of the new species they described.

He was a Fellow of the Royal Entomological Society and its president 1927–1928.

References
Chvála, M. 1970  [Collin, J. E.]  Entomologist 103 144–146.
Evenhuis, N. L. 1997 Litteratura taxonomica dipterorum (1758-1930). Volume 1 (A-K); Volume 2 (L-Z).Leiden, Backhuys Publishers.
Smith, K. G. V. 1968: [Collin, J. E.] Entomologist's Monthly Magazine (3) 104 145–148. 
Smith, K. G. V. & Morge, G. 1970 [Collin, J. E.] Beitr. Ent. 20 202–203.

External links
Bishop Museum Portrait

English entomologists
Dipterists
1876 births
1968 deaths
Fellows of the Royal Entomological Society